The Bangor Symphony Orchestra is one of the oldest continually-operating community orchestras in the United States. Based in Bangor, Maine, it was founded in 1896 by Abbie N. Garland and Horace M. Pullen, its first director. The present organization was incorporated in 1918.

References

External links

American orchestras
Musical groups from Maine
Musical groups established in 1896
Culture of Bangor, Maine
Tourist attractions in Bangor, Maine
Performing arts in Maine